Pedro Rangel  (born 16 September 1988) is a Mexican male volleyball player. He was part of the Mexico men's national volleyball team at the 2014 FIVB Volleyball Men's World Championship in Poland. He played for Moerser SC.

Clubs

 Tigres UANL (2009)
 Palma Voley (2010)
 ASUL Lyon Volley (2012)
 Orange Nassau (2012)
 Moerser SC (2013)
 Tigres UANL (2014)
 Fonte do Bastardo (2016)
 CAI Teruel (2017)
 Tourcoing Lille Métropole (2019)
 Omonia Nicosia (2020)
 CS Municipal Arcada Galați (2021)

References

1988 births
Living people
Mexican men's volleyball players
Place of birth missing (living people)
Olympic volleyball players of Mexico
Volleyball players at the 2016 Summer Olympics